Lamri Laachi (born October 1, 1951 in Sétif) is a former Algerian footballer. He played as a defender. He spent the majority of his career with Paris FC except for a stint with RCF Paris.

External links

FootMercato Profile

1951 births
Living people
Algerian footballers
Algerian expatriate footballers
Algerian emigrants to France
Expatriate footballers in France
Racing Club de France Football players
Paris FC players
Ligue 1 players
Ligue 2 players
Footballers from Sétif
Association football defenders